= Rubidium hexafluorotitanate =

Names
- Other names: Dirubidium hexafluorotitanate; Titanium rubidium hexafluoride

Identifiers
CAS Number	16962-41-7
3D model (JSmol)	Interactive image
PubChem CID	21113992
- InChI: InChI=1S/6FH.2Rb.Ti/h6*1H;;;/q;;;;;;2*+1;+4/p-6 Key: OUVDYAIBXBEMHU-UHFFFAOYSA-H
- SMILES: F[Ti-2](F)(F)(F)(F)F.[Rb+].[Rb+]

Properties
Chemical formula	F_{6}Rb_{2}Ti
Molar mass	332.793 g·mol^{−1}
Appearance	powder
- Except where otherwise noted, data are given for materials in their standard state (at 25 °C [77 °F], 100 kPa). Infobox references

Rubidium hexafluorotitanate is an inorganic compound of rubidium, fluorine, and titanium with the chemical formula Rb_{2}TiF_{6}.

== Physical properties ==
Rubidium hexafluorotitanate forms a powder.
